Harry Fricker was a New Zealand rugby league footballer who was one of the founding players of the Ponsonby United team. He represented Auckland from 1910 to 1914. He fought in World War I and was injured in battle.

Early years
Harry Fricker originally played rugby for the Ponsonby District Football Club and was a junior representative player while there. He was a house decorator by trade and worked in partnership with his brother.

Rugby league
In 1910 he switched to rugby league as part of a large group of players from the Ponsonby club who changed codes at the same time. He played for the Ponsonby United club who had recently formed. He was selected for the Auckland team which played against Great Britain at Victoria Park on 23 July 1910 and went on tour with the side on their seven match tour of New Zealand playing 7 matches in all in that season.  He continued to play for Ponsonby until 1914.

World War I
In August 1914 Fricker volunteered for the armed forces. He was part of the New Zealand Field Troop of Engineers who originally camped in Epsom before travelling to Palmerston North. After travelling to England Fricker played for the New Zealand Army rugby team against the English Guards. In June 1917 Sergeant Harry Fricker was awarded a military medal for “acts of gallantry in the field” while serving as an Engineer at the battle of Messines. He left the war after serving four months at Gallipoli where he was invalided to England and hospitalised due to his injuries. He arrived back in New Zealand in April 1918.

Later years
A year after his return from war his wife, Winifred Maude died in Wellington in August. His mother died in September of the same year. Harry Fricker died in 1958 aged 73.

References

Ponsonby Ponies players
1958 deaths
Auckland rugby league team players
New Zealand builders
New Zealand Military Forces personnel of World War I
Footballers who switched code
1880s births
Rugby league props
Rugby league second-rows
New Zealand Army soldiers
New Zealand recipients of the Military Medal